The Kings County District Attorney's Office, also known as the Brooklyn District Attorney's Office, is the district attorney's office for Kings County, coterminous with the Borough of Brooklyn, in New York City. The office is responsible for the prosecution of violations of the laws of New York. (Violations of federal law are prosecuted by the United States Attorney for the Eastern District of New York). The current district attorney is Eric Gonzalez.

History
In a legislative act of February 12, 1796, New York State was divided into seven districts, each with its own Assistant Attorney General. Kings County was part of the First District, which also included Queens, Richmond, Suffolk, and Westchester counties. (At that time, Queens County included much of present-day Nassau County, and Westchester County included present-day Bronx County.) In 1801, the office of Assistant Attorney General was renamed District Attorney and New York County was added to the First District. Westchester County was separated from the First District in 1813, and New York County was separated in 1815. In 1818, each county in the state became its own separate district.

Until 1822, district attorneys were appointed by the Council of Appointment, and held office "during the Council's pleasure", meaning that there was no defined term. Under the State Constitution of 1821, the district attorney was appointed to a three-year term by the Court of General Sessions, and under the State Constitution of 1846, the office became elective by popular ballot. The governor filled vacancies until a successor was elected, always to a full term, at the next annual election. An acting district attorney was appointed by the Court of General Sessions pending the Governor's action.

Since the Consolidation Charter of New York City in 1898, the terms of the district attorneys in New York City have coincided with the mayor's term, and are for four years. In case of a vacancy, the governor appoints an interim district attorney and can call a special election for the remainder of the term.

List of Kings County District Attorneys

References

External links
The Brooklyn District Attorney's Office: Official website

Brooklyn